The Mubarak Mosque or Moubarak Mosque is an Ahmadi Muslim mosque located in the commune of Saint-Prix in the Val-d'Oise department in northern France. This mosque is the first Ahmadiyya mosque in the country.

Inauguration
The mayor of Saint-Prix, Jean-Pierre Enjalbert, was at first against the idea of an Ahmadiyya mosque in his town, but later changed his mind and gave his approval. He said, "What reassured us is the fact we’ve got to know them through all these years, had time to observe them, see how they act. I came to many meetings, listened to what they had to say and learned what their message was."

The Mosque was inaugurated by the Mirza Masroor Ahmad, the Head of the Ahmadiyya Muslim Community, on 10 October 2008.

References

Ahmadiyya mosques in France
Mosques completed in 2008